Megachile subrixator is a species of bee in the family Megachilidae. It was described by Theodore Dru Alison Cockerell in 1915.

References

Subrixator
Insects described in 1915